Frederiksted is both the town and one of the two administrative districts of St. Croix, U.S. Virgin Islands. It is a grid-planned city, designed by surveyor Jens Beckfor, originally to 14x14 blocks but built 7x7 to enhance the island commerce in the 1700s.  Frederiksted has fewer than 1,000 people in the town proper, but nearly 10,000 in the greater western side of the island.  Christiansted (mid-island on the north) is about 30 years older but commerce was limited by its natural, shallow protective reef.  Frederiksted was built in the leeward side of the island (shadow of the wind) for calm seas and a naturally deep port. It is home to Fort Frederik, constructed to protect the town from pirate raids and attacks from rival imperialist nations and named after Frederick V of Denmark, who purchased the Danish West Indies in 1754.

Frederiksted is often referred to as "Freedom City" by locals.  This nickname has to do with the fact that the town was the site of the emancipation of slaves in the then-Danish West Indies. On July 3, 1848, freed slave and skilled craftsman Moses Gottlieb, who also was known as "General Buddhoe," led the uprising, organized slaves on St. Croix's West End plantations, and marched on the town of Frederiksted.  The emancipation of slaves was proclaimed on July 3, 1848, at Fort Frederik on the waterfront at the northern edge of Frederiksted by Governor-General Peter von Scholten.

Frederiksted is home to one of two deep water ports on St. Croix and is the sole port for cruise ships visiting the island.  Passengers disembark at the Frederiksted Pier, where they may explore the town, enjoy the beaches, rent a car, or catch a waiting taxi that will take them to other points of interest across St. Croix.  The other deep water port is located at the South Port which includes the tank farm of the former Hovensa oil refinery  as well as Renaissance Industrial Park. Several government offices occupy historic buildings in the town.

Briefly in the early 2000s, Frederiksted was a port for Seaborne Airlines seaplanes, which are based in the town of Christiansted.  Seaplane service ended after less than one year of service due to a tropical storm damaging the port facility.

History

The 1867 Virgin Islands earthquake and tsunami heavily damaged the town. The tsunami with an estimated height of 7.6 meters beached the USS Monongahela onshore. At least five people were killed.

The town was destroyed by a labor revolt (known as "The Fireburn" because arson was utilized as a means of revolt) in October 1878, which was led by four Crucian female laborers.  Frederiksted was later restored during the Victorian era, as reflected in the town's architecture.

Modern Frederiksted operates at a slower pace than Christiansted, except for carnival in January and whenever cruise ships dock in Frederiksted's deepwater port. In recent years successful redevelopment efforts have begun to restore and revitalize this National Historic Site. The 2000 census population of the town was 732, and that of the larger sub-district was 3,767.

In Media

Movies
1994 The Shawshank Redemption
1986 Dreams of Gold: The Mel Fisher Story
1983 Trading Places
1977 The Island of Dr. Moreau (1977 film)

Music
2014 Pressure (reggae musician) music video shot in Frederiksted

Renovation and Revitalisation 
Several companies have participated in drafting plans to refurbish and enhance the greater Frederiksted area.  Coastal Systems was retained by the Public Finance Authority to develop concepts for a waterfront park, beach, cruise pier, and other site improvements. Teams of land planners, engineers, and landscape architects met with local interest groups to develop conceptual plans for the redevelopment of the area. Environmental regulatory surveys and permits were managed by the Coastal Zone Management (CZM) Agency of the USVI. Phase I of the project was completed, which consisted of the reconstruction of the waterfront park while maintaining the historical facade representative of St. Croix's heritage. Natural stonework was used throughout the project site in accordance with the local architectural style, enhancing the authenticity of the arrival experience.

Phase II of the project, contemplated for the future, will involve the reconstruction of the community waterfront north of the fort and include the recreation of breakwaters, the reconstruction of Paul E. Joseph Stadium, and the restoration of the beach, restroom facilities, retaining pond, utilities, parking areas, and soccer fields.

Volunteers, community, and art 
Volunteer-ism is a big part of Frederiksted.  
Clean Sweep Frederiksted engages volunteers in community clean ups, mural and garden projects among opportunities. They also worked with the Artists Guild of St. Croix to install dozens of painted rum barrels as community trash bins.  
The Artists Guild of St. Croix has installed several murals, paintings, and sponsors scholarships. Delta Dorsch who was born in Frederiksted, wrote two books The Role of the Storyteller in the Preservation of Virgin Islands Culture (1999) and contributed to ''The Glory Days of Frederiksted (2004) about cultural aspects of the community.

Climate 

Frederiksted has a tropical climate with warm weather year-round.

Water temperatures of 78-79'F in winter and ~85'F in September. The waters are typically very calm as Frederiksted is in the leeward side (shadow of the island's wind) with ~12 inch tide.

The sunrise varies from 5:30 a.m. in summer and 7:00 a.m. in winter. Sunset varies between 5:40 p.m. in winter and 7:10 p.m. in summer. St. Croix does not use the daylight saving time. The ultraviolet index or UV index varies from 10+ UV index in the summer and a maximum of 7 UV index in winter.

Persistent  Easterly trade winds, moving from east to west across the island year round create a cool breeze.

Rainforests are located on this western side of St. Croix due to the topography and 1,400 foot peaks and the tradewinds.  This rainforest climate is unique to the Frederiksted side of St. Croix.

Hurricanes:
     1984 Nov. Category 1 Hurricane Klaus (1984) caused severe flooding 
     1989, Sept. Category 4 Hugo devastated ~85% of St. Croix, destroying the Old Frederiksted Pier
     1995, Sept. Category 2 Marilyn caused severe damage to St. Croix, in particular to the Frederiksted side of the island and even more damage to St. Thomas.
     1998, Sept. Category 4 Hurricane Georges affected 15% of the island's power grid, wind and wave damage. 
     1999, Oct. Category 2 Hurricane Jose (1999) minimal damage
     1999, Nov. Category 4 Hurricane Lenny passes 21 miles south of St. Croix, 15-20' waves destroyed many beaches dumping 6.5 ft (2 m) of sand onto coastal roads about 100 ft (30 m) inland, wind damage, and flooding/erosion.
     2004, Sept. Category 3 Hurricane Jeanne 
     2008, Oct. Category 1 Hurricane Omar (2008) Nearly the entire island lost power, scores of boats were damaged or destroyed, and an oil spill.
     2010, Aug/Sept. Category 4 Hurricane Earl (2010) minimal damage, power outages
     2011, Aug. Tropical Storm Hurricane Irene hit St. Croix, damaging beaches
     2014, Aug. Category 1 Hurricane Bertha (2014) hit St. Croix as a tropical storm, damaging beaches
     2017, Sept. Category 5 Hurricane Irma passed ~100 miles north of St. Croix with local winds near 100 mph removing small branches and leaves.
     2017, Sept. Category 5 Hurricane Maria passed ~10 miles south of St. Croix.

Notable people 
Joe Christopher, former Major League Baseball player for the Pittsburgh Pirates and New York Mets
Victor Cornelins, Danish school teacher, musician, and public speaker.

See also
 Christiansted
 Saint Croix
 List of settlements in the United States Virgin Islands
Cruzan Rum
Danish West Indies
Fireburn
St. George Village Botanical Garden
Frederiksted Historic District

External links

 Fsted.com

References

Populated places established in 1751
Populated places in Saint Croix, U.S. Virgin Islands
Planned cities in the United States
1751 establishments in the Danish colonial empire
Towns in the United States Virgin Islands
Sub-districts of Saint Croix, U.S. Virgin Islands